Crescent Street station may refer to:
 Crescent Street station (BMT Fulton Street Line), a station on the demolished BMT Fulton Street Line
 Crescent Street station (BMT Jamaica Line), a station on the BMT Jamaica Line